Bruno Urlić (born November 11, 1975), is a Bosnian violinist and record producer. He is a current member of the Massimo's band and a former member of rock band Zabranjeno Pušenje.

Life and career 
Urlić was born and raised in Sarajevo, SFR Yugoslavia (nowadays Bosnia and Herzegovina) from parents who were musicians. In 1991, he had joined pop-rock band Kosa, where he played keyboards. Two years later, he had enrolled Sarajevo Music Academy but withdrew shortly due to War in Bosnia. In Summer 1994, he accompanied Sarajevo's musicians and Indian conductor Zubin Mehta who performed Mozart's Requiem at the Sarajevo City Hall concert. By the end of the year, he had left Sarajevo and joined the Bruno Orchestra on their three-month Italy tour. Later, he decided to move permanently to Zagreb, Croatia. Urlić earned his degree in violin from the Academy of Music, University of Zagreb in 1998.

In 1997, Urlić joined Bosnian rock band Zabranjeno Pušenje. He performed on their two studio albums, Agent tajne sile (1999) and Bog vozi Mercedes (2001), as well as on two live albums; Hapsi sve! (1998) and Live in St. Louis (2004). He left the band in 2004 and joined a Macedonian folk band Ezerki & 7/8 from Zagreb. In Summer 2013, he joined the band of Massimo Savić.

Urlić is a member of the Damir Kukuruzović gypsy-jazz quartet. Together with Kukuruzović, he has collaborated with relevant performers of the genre such as Angelo Debarre, Raphaël Faÿs and Wawau Adler. He is also a member and producer of Mavi Kan, an ethno-jazz trio. As a session musician he collaborated with many musicians from former Yugoslavia, such as Rade Šerbedžija, Zoran Predin, Severina, Hladno Pivo, Gibonni, Darko Rundek, Kemal Monteno, Hari Mata Hari, Crvena jabuka, Toše Proeski.

Discography 

Zabranjeno pušenje
 Hapsi sve! (1998)
 Agent tajne sile (1999)
 Bog vozi Mercedes (2001)
 Live in St. Louis (2004)
 Hodi da ti čiko nešto da (2006) (Guest appearance)

References

External links
 Bruno Urlić Discography at Discogs

1975 births
Living people
Academy of Music, University of Zagreb alumni
Bosnia and Herzegovina musicians
Bosnia and Herzegovina record producers
Jazz violinists
Rock violinists
Musicians from Sarajevo
Musicians from Zagreb
Zabranjeno pušenje members
21st-century violinists